Celada Marlantes is a locality in the municipality of Campoo de Enmedio, in the northern Spanish autonomous community of Cantabria.

Geography
It has a Latitude of 42° 57' 0 North,a Longitude of 4° 5' 60 West, and an Altitude of 3481 feet.

Towns in Spain
Municipalities in Cantabria